

Qualification 

The top eight teams in the Atlantic Coast Conference earned a berth into the ACC Tournament. The quarterfinal round is held at campus sites, with the semifinals and final held at MUSC Health Stadium in Charleston, SC.

Bracket

Schedule

Quarterfinals

Semifinals

Final

All-Tournament team

See also 
 Atlantic Coast Conference
 2016 Atlantic Coast Conference women's soccer season
 2016 NCAA Division I women's soccer season
 2016 NCAA Division I Women's Soccer Tournament

References

ACC Women's Soccer Tournament
2016 Atlantic Coast Conference women's soccer season